Emmanuel Baptist Church is a Baptist megachurch in the Clinton Hill neighborhood of Brooklyn, New York, on the northwest corner of Lafayette Avenue and St. James Place, affiliated with the American Baptist Churches USA. The attendance is 2,200 peoples.  The senior pastor is Anthony L. Trufant.

History
The congregation was established around 1882 with 194 members that had broken from the Washington Avenue Baptist Church (Brooklyn, New York). The Emmanuel congregation commissioned architect E. L. Roberts, the architect of the Washington Avenue Baptist Church, to build them a small, Gothic-style, two-story interim chapel on St. James Place (1882–1883)." Fund raising for the permanent church began in 1884.

It was built 1887 to designs by architect Francis H. Kimball in the Gothic Revival style "as a synthesis of the cathedral type and the Baptist preaching church." It is considered one of Kimball's finest designs. It was listed on the National Register of Historic Places in 1977. The church building was opened on April 17, 1887. Architectural critic Montgomery Schuyler praised it as "a very rich scholarly and well considered design." The most conspicuous design feature of the interior was the central font.

In 2017, the attendance was 2,200 people.

See also 
List of New York City Designated Landmarks in Brooklyn

References

Properties of religious function on the National Register of Historic Places in Brooklyn
Churches completed in 1887
19th-century Baptist churches in the United States
New York City Designated Landmarks in Brooklyn
Gothic Revival church buildings in New York City
Religious organizations established in 1882
Baptist churches in New York City
Churches in Brooklyn
Evangelical megachurches in the United States
Megachurches in New York (state)